Senator Converse may refer to:

George L. Converse (1827–1897), Ohio State Senate
Julius Converse (1798–1885), Vermont State Senate

See also
Charles Cleveland Convers (1810–1860), Ohio State Senate